Ludwig Baumann (born 1950 in Rosenheim) is a German operatic bass-baritone. He is also the founder and director of the Gut Immling Chiemgau opera festival in Halfing.

References

German bass-baritones
1950 births
Living people
People from Rosenheim
Recipients of the Cross of the Order of Merit of the Federal Republic of Germany